Abhijit Mukherjee is an Indian professor, scientist and currently Professor of Geology and Geophysics and the School of Environmental Science and Engineering of IIT Kharagpur. He has been selected for Shanti Swarup Bhatnagar Prize for Science and Technology in 2020 in the field of Earth Atmosphere Ocean and Planetary Sciences.

Abhijit Mukherjee presently works as an Associate Professor at the Department of Geology and Geophysics and the School of Environmental Science and Engineering of Indian Institute of Technology (IIT)Kharagpur. Presently, He has also been the Associate Editor/Editorial Board of Scientific Reports (Nature), ES&T Engineering (ACS), Groundwater for Sustainable Development (Elsevier) and Journal of Earth System Sciences (Springer Nature). Previously, he has also served in Editorial role in Journal of Hydrology (Elsevier) and Applied Geochemistry (Elsevier).  He is well known for his contribution in the field of Groundwater Geology or Hydrogeology.

Mukherjee’s main research areas are physical, chemical and isotope hydrogeology, including numerical flow modeling, computation, contaminant transport, water policy applications. He is globally known for his studies on geological and human-sourced groundwater pollution (e.g. arsenic, fluoride, sanitation-borne and emerging contaminants) in more than a dozen countries. He also specializes in groundwater-surface water interactions. In India, this work has provided input to the government in understanding country’s drinking water and food security. He has also done extensive work on groundwater quantity and scarcity by understanding decadal-scale groundwater storage changes over the Indian subcontinent by using advanced computation and Artificial Intelligence techniques. Mukherjee also leads one of South Asia’s first Urban Geoscience project in the ancient city of Varanasi in India

The Council of Scientific and Industrial Research, the apex agency of the Government of India for scientific research, awarded him the Shanti Swarup Bhatnagar Prize for Science and Technology, one of the highest Indian science awards for his contributions to Earth, Atmosphere, Ocean and Planetary Sciences in 2020.

Early life
Mukherjee hails from Kolkata. He studied in South Point High School and Calcutta University. He went to United States for higher studies and post-doctoral research. Mukherjee worked in Canada for several years and after returning to India joined in IIT-Kharagpur. Mukherjee works there as an Associate Professor at the Department of Geology and Geophysics and the School of Environmental Science and Engineering.

Mukherjee completed Bachelor of Science with Honors (B.Sc.[Hons]) in Geology, from the Asutosh College of the University of Calcutta, India, 1997 and his masters in Geology, University of Calcutta, India, 1999. He went to United States for higher studies and post-doctoral research. He holds another master degree from University of Kentucky, USA, 2003 in Geology (Hydrogeology). His master’s thesis involved studying VOC and radioactive contamination through groundwater-river water interaction in a tributary to the Ohio River in western Kentucky. Later he completed his PhD from University of Kentucky, USA, 2006 in Geology (Hydrogeology). The subject of his doctoral thesis was “Deeper groundwater flow and chemistry of the arsenic contaminated aquifers of the western Bengal basin, West Bengal, India.” Renowned hydrogeolostist, Dr. Alan Fryar acted as his academic advisor.

He was a Postdoctoral Fellow at the Bureau of Economic Geology, Jackson School of Geoscience, in the University of Texas at Austin, 2006-2008 in supervision of Prof. Bridget Scanlon. Mukherjee also holds a Professional Diploma in Software Engineering, from National Institute of Information Technology (NIIT), India, 2001

Career 

Mukherjee is currently the Associate Professor at the Department of Geology and Geophysics and School of Environmental Science and Engineering, Indian Institute of Technology (IIT) Kharagpur from March 2016. He joined the institute as an Assistant professor from September 2010.

He served as a Physical Hydrogeologist at Alberta Geological Survey, Energy Resources Conservation Board of Government of Alberta, Edmonton, Canada from 2008–2010. Prior to that he was Postdoctoral Fellow at Bureau of Economic Geology, Jackson School of Geosciences, University of Texas at Austin, USA from 2006–2008. Early to it he served as Research Assistant in Geology, University of Kentucky, USA, in the summers of 2002 – 2003 and Instructor and Teaching Assistant in Geology, University of Kentucky, USA, 2001–2006.

Research
Mukherjee's works was acknowledged, nationally and internationally. He researched on the subject of groundwater exploration for suitable and sustainable drinking water sources including Arsenic and other contaminants. His research group developed an AI prediction model for detecting groundwater Arsenic in the Ganges delta.

Mukherjee and his co -workers work on various groundwater studies to determine the results and consequences thereby taking the necessary steps to help the mankind at large. He is involved in many research works for the betterment of the society such as  the evaluation and quantification of policy interventions and groundwater governance , urban geoscientific study to understand resource and resilience of future Indian cities (with Pilot study at Varanasi ), Ground and Satellite based estimation of groundwater storage over Indian sub-continent, Groundwater-sea water dynamics in the Bay of Bengal, Effect of climatic factors on groundwater recharge, Controls of arsenic transport from global to pore-scale. Application of Artificial Intelligence in predicting future groundwater resources, Assessment of effects of sedimentation and tectonics on hydrology and regional, numerical groundwater flow and hydrogeochemical evolution simulations of the Canadian Rocky Mountain foreland basins. He has done research work in various counties, including Argentina, Bangladesh, Canada, China, Costa Rica, India, and USA.

Mukherjee is regarded as one of the most well known hydrogeology in South Asia. He has done field-based and numerical research quality and quantity of groundwater-sourced drinking water availability across India have significantly contributed to the recent advancement of groundwater research in India. Mukherjee’s recent research work have significantly contributed to support and evaluate the Government of India (GoI) missions like MNREGA on groundwater rejuvenation in India (https://indianexpress.com/article/india/indias-falling-groundwater-storage-being-replenished-study-4792829/) groundwater pollution for Swachh Bharat Abhiyan, understanding the flow of river Ganga for Namami Gange mission, etc. He has also authored the long-term groundwater policy and management plans for the Government of West Bengal as their Vision 2020 on drinking water.

Dr. Mukherjee’s research work on geological and human influences on groundwater pollution (arsenic, pesticide, sanitation-sourced fecal pollution) in the Indus-Ganga-Brahmaputra river basins has attracted wide national and international attention. He is regarded as the leading groundwater pollution expert in the country and serves as a member of Fluoride Task Force of Government of West Bengal. He was one of the first Indian scientists to propose a “Water Security Bill" for India. This led to his invitation in 2014 as Witness to the Estimate Committee of the Parliament of India. He and his students’ recent work on groundwater quantity variation across India specifically on recent groundwater rejuvenation in parts of the India, as consequence of government policy interventions, has attracted global acclamation and media coverage. This research provided unprecedented support to the Government of India missions in evaluating outcomes of missions like MNREGA on groundwater rejuvenation in parts of India. The work was also highlighted as the Image of the Day (September 22, 2017) in NASA website.

Awards and recognitions 

Mukherjee has been endowed with various awards for his exemplary work. The Council of Scientific and Industrial Research awarded him the Shanti Swarup Bhatnagar Prize, one of the highest Indian science awards in 2020.  He has been awarded with Kharaka award which is bestowed annually to excellence in research in geochemistry. Mukherjee is elected to Geological Society of America International Committee (2020–24), 2019. He received the Faculty Excellence Award at Indian Institute of Technology Kharagpur in the year 2018. The Newton-Bhabha Research Grant Award (as member of consortium), NERC(UK)-DST (India) was awarded to him in 2018. He received the prestigious National Geoscience Award 2014, Government of India, conferred in 2016 by President of India.

Some of other selected awarded to him include:

•          Thermo Fisher Outstanding Scientist in Water Analytics, Thermo Fisher Scientific, 2016

•          Young Scientist Award, International Association of Hydrogeologist-INC, 2015

•          Graduate Research Award, Geological Survey of America, 2004

Books and publications 

Mukherjee is well known for his authoritative publications in some of the most respected subject journals published by the global publishers like Elsevier, Springer-Nature, Nature Publishing Group, AGU, Geoscience World etc. as well as books published by Springer, Elsevier etc.. These publications are primarily on groundwater systems across the globe. The journals includes Nature Geoscience, Geophysical Research Letters, Journal of Hydrology, Journal of Contaminant Hydrology, Water Resources Research, Advances in Water Research, Science of Total Environment, Applied Geochemistry etc.

The books edited by Mukherjee like “Global Groundwater: Source, Scarcity, Security, Sustainability, Solutions” and “Groundwater of South Asia”,  showcase the integrated and up to date knowledge on groundwater, ranging from availability to pollution, nation-level groundwater management to transboundary aquifer governance, and global-scale reviews to local-scale case-studies. Several of the countries in these studied areas host some of the densest population across the world and the highest global users of groundwater, e.g. India, USA, China, and Pakistan. The available groundwater is often extravagantly abstracted thereby characterizing much of the areas as under very high water stressed. Additionally, geogenic and anthropogenic pollution of groundwater pose larger uncertainty and constraints even on the available groundwater. Hence, the global to local-scale challenges highlights the need of creating solid evidence and knowledge-bases for integrated scientific and technological advances, as well as building policy and management capacities in order to adapt and evolve for the present day groundwater needs and potential groundwater demand for future generations in a sustainable manner.

Books include:

[4] Mukherjee, A., Scanlon, B., Aurelia, A., Langan, S., McKenzie. A., Guo,H., (eds.), 2020 (in press). Global Groundwater: source, scarcity, sustainability, security and solutions. Elsevier, 

https://www.elsevier.com/books/global-groundwater/mukherjee/978-0-12-818172-0

[3] Mukherjee, A. (ed.), 2020 (in-press). Riverine Systems: Understanding the Hydrological and Hydrosocial Dynamics. Springer-Capital Publishing

[2] Mukherjee, A. (ed.), 2018. Groundwater of South Asia.Springer, 799 pgs.

https://www.springer.com/gp/book/9789811038884

[1] Ramanathan, A., Johnston, S., Mukherjee, A., Nath, B. (eds.), 2015.Safe and sustainability use of arsenic-contaminated aquifers in the Gangetic plain.Springer, .

https://www.springer.com/gp/book/9783319161235

References 

Recipients of the Shanti Swarup Bhatnagar Award in Earth, Atmosphere, Ocean & Planetary Sciences
Living people
Scientists from West Bengal
University of Calcutta alumni
Bengali scientists
People from Kolkata
Indian earth scientists
Academic staff of IIT Kharagpur
Year of birth missing (living people)